Spanish is a grammatically inflected language, which means that many words are modified ("marked") in small ways, usually at the end, according to their changing functions. Verbs are marked for tense, aspect, mood, person, and number (resulting in up to fifty conjugated forms per verb).  Nouns follow a two-gender system and are marked for number. Personal pronouns are inflected for person, number, gender (including a residual neuter), and a very reduced case system; the Spanish pronominal system represents a simplification of the ancestral Latin system.

Spanish was the first of the European vernaculars to have a grammar treatise, published in 1492 by the Andalusian philologist Antonio de Nebrija and presented to Queen Isabella of Castile at Salamanca.

The  (RAE, Royal Spanish Academy) traditionally dictates the normative rules of the Spanish language, as well as its orthography.

Differences between formal varieties of Peninsular and American Spanish are remarkably few, and someone who has learned the language in one area will generally have no difficulties of communication in the other; however, pronunciation does vary, as well as grammar and vocabulary.

Verbs 

Every Spanish verb belongs to one of three form classes, characterized by the infinitive ending:  -ar, -er, or -ir—sometimes called the first, second, and third conjugations, respectively.

A Spanish verb has nine indicative tenses with more-or-less direct English equivalents:  the present tense ('I walk'), the preterite ('I walked'), the imperfect ('I was walking' or 'I used to walk'), the present perfect ('I have walked'), the past perfect — also called the pluperfect ('I had walked'), the future ('I will walk'), the future perfect ('I will have walked'), the conditional simple ('I would walk') and the conditional perfect ('I would have walked').

In most dialects, each tense has six potential forms, varying for first, second, or third person and for singular or plural number. In the second person, Spanish maintains the so-called "T–V distinction" between familiar and formal modes of address. The formal second-person pronouns take third-person verb forms.

The second-person familiar plural is expressed in most of Spain with the pronoun  and its characteristic verb forms (e.g.,  'you [pl.] eat'), while in Latin American Spanish it merges with the formal second-person plural (e.g.). Thus  is used as both the formal and familiar second-person pronoun in Latin America.

See "".

In the tables of paradigms below, the (optional) subject pronouns appear in parentheses.

Present indicative 
The present indicative is used to express actions or states of being in a present time frame. For example:
  (I am tall). (Subject pronoun  not required and not routinely used.)
  (She sings in the club).
  (We all live in a yellow submarine).
  ([It] is ten thirty).

Past tenses 
Spanish has a number of verb tenses used to express actions or states of being in a past time frame. The two that are "simple" in form (formed with a single word, rather than being compound verbs) are the preterite and the imperfect.

Preterite 
The preterite is used to express actions or events that took place in the past, and which were instantaneous or are viewed as completed. For example:
  (She died yesterday)
  (Pablo turned the lights off)
  (I ate the rice)
  (You had your hair cut, Lit. "You cut yourself the hair")

Imperfect or "copretérito" 
The imperfect expresses actions or states that are viewed as ongoing in the past. For example:
  (I was/used to be funny in the past).
  (You ate a lot – literally, this sentence is saying "You used to eat a lot", saying that in the past, the person being referred to had a characteristic of "eating a lot").
  (They were listening to the radio).
All three of the sentences above describe "non-instantaneous" actions that are viewed as continuing in the past. The characteristic in the first sentence and the action in the second were continuous, not instantaneous occurrences. In the third sentence, the speaker focuses on the action in progress, not on its beginning or end.

Note that (1) for all verbs in the imperfect, the first- and third-person singular share the same form; and (2)  and  verbs share the same set of endings.

Using preterite and imperfect together 
The preterite and the imperfect can be combined in the same sentence to express the occurrence of an event in one clause during an action or state expressed in another clause. For example:
  (They were listening to the radio when they heard a noise outside.)
  (I was in my room when you came in.)
  (It was a very peaceful day when that happened.)
In all three cases, an event or completed action interrupts an ongoing state or action. For example, in the second sentence, the speaker states that he was in his room (expressed through the imperfect to reflect the ongoing or unfinished state of being there) when the other person "interrupted" that state by entering (expressed through the preterite to suggest a completed action).

Present progressive and imperfect progressive 
The present and imperfect progressive both are used to express ongoing, progressive action in the present and past, respectively. For example:
  (I am doing my homework)
  (We are studying)
  (I was listening to the radio)
  (He was cleaning his room)

Forming gerunds 
e.g.
e.g.
,  → , .

Subjunctive 
The subjunctive of a verb is used to express certain connotations in sentences such as a wish or desire, a demand, an emotion, uncertainty, or doubt.

Present subjunctive 
Normally, a verb would be conjugated in the present indicative to indicate an event in the present frame of time.
  (I am very ambitious)
  (Marta brings the food)
If the sentence expresses a desire, demand, or emotion, or something similar, in the present tense, the subjunctive is used.
  (I want you to be very ambitious—literally, I want that you be very ambitious)
  (I am happy that Marta brings the food)
  (It is a shame that you arrive late)

The subjunctive is also used to convey doubt, denial, or uncertainty.
  (I search for a friend who will be likable or I search for a likable friend)
  (There are no authors who write that.)
  (It is possible that she knows a lot.)
  (It does not seem that they have much money.)
In the first two examples, the ideally likable friend has not yet been found and remains an uncertainty, and authors "who write that" are not known to exist. In the third, possibility is not certainty, but rather a conjecture, and the last expresses clear doubt. Thus, subjunctive is used.
Some of the phrases and verbs that require sentences to have subjunctive formation include:
 
 
Some phrases that require the indicative instead, because they express certainty, include:
 

To form the first-person singular subjunctive, first take the present indicative first-person singular form of a verb. The other conjugations work similarly, as follows:
 
 
 
 
 
 

 
However, the Royal Spanish Academy, following Argentinian usage, recommends using the  forms:
 ; ;

Imperfect subjunctive 
Today, the two forms of the imperfect subjunctive – for example, "" and "", from "" – are largely interchangeable.*  The  form derives (as in most Romance languages) from the Latin pluperfect subjunctive, while the  form derives from the Latin pluperfect indicative. The use of one or the other is largely a matter of personal taste and dialect. Many only use the  forms in speech, but vary between the two in writing.  Many may spontaneously use either, or even prefer the rarer  forms. The imperfect subjunctive is formed for basically the same reasons as the present subjunctive, but is used for other tenses and time frames.

Nouns 

In Spanish, as in other Romance languages, all nouns belong to one of two genders, "masculine" or "feminine", and many adjectives change their form to agree in gender with the noun they modify. For most nouns that refer to persons, grammatical gender matches biological gender.

Adjectives 

Spanish generally uses adjectives in a similar way to English and most other Indo-European languages.  However, there are three key differences between English and Spanish adjectives.

 In Spanish, adjectives usually go after the noun they modify.  The exception is when the writer/speaker is being slightly emphatic, or even poetic, about a particular quality of an object (rather than the mundane use of using the quality to specify which particular object they are referring to).
  could either mean that there are many red houses in the world but I wish to talk about the one that I happen to own, or that I have many houses but am referring to the red one.  = My house, the red one.
  means that I am stressing how red my particular house is (probably the only house I have).  = My house, which is obviously red.
 In Spanish, adjectives agree with what they refer to in terms of both number (singular/plural) and gender (masculine/feminine).
 In Spanish, it is perfectly normal to let an adjective stand in for a noun or pronoun—with (where people are involved) no implication of condescension or rudeness. For example,  means "the tall ones" or "the tall men".  means "the big one" or "the big man".

Determiners 

Spanish uses determiners in a similar way to English. The main difference is that they inflect for both number (singular/plural) and gender (masculine/feminine). Common determiners include  ("the"),  ("a"),  ("this"),  ("much, a lot"),  ("some").

Pronouns 

Spanish pronouns fall into the same broad categories as English pronouns do: personal, demonstrative, interrogative, relative, and possessive. The personal pronouns–those that vary in form according to whether they represent the first, second, or third grammatical person–include a variety of second-person forms that differ not only according to number (singular or plural), but also according to formality or the social relation between speakers. Additionally, these second-person forms vary according to geographical region. Because the form of a conjugated verb reflects the person and number of its subject, subject pronouns are usually omitted, except where they are felt to be needed for emphasis or disambiguation.

Adverbs
Spanish adverbs work much like their English counterparts, e.g.  ("very"),  ("a little"),  ("far"),  ("much, a lot"),  ("almost"), etc.  To form adverbs from adjectives, the adverbial suffix  is generally added to the feminine singular of the adjective, whether or not it differs from the masculine singular. Thus:

  ("clear", m. sg.) →  (f. sg.) →  ("clearly")
  ("fast, rapid", m. sg.) →  (f. sg.) →  ("fast, quickly, rapidly")
  ("natural", m. & f. sg.) →  ("naturally")
  ("sad", m. & f. sg.) →  ("sadly")
  ("bold", m. & f. sg.) →  ("boldly")

As in English, some adverbs are identical to their adjectival counterparts.

Thus:

  = "quickly and easily"
  = "slowly, carefully, and skillfully"
  = "partially or completely"

Thus  ("earlier"),  ("faster, quicker, more quickly"),  ("less interestingly"), etc. "the most quickly that you can"),  ("most interestingly of all"),  ("the least clearly of them"), etc.

Prepositions 

Spanish has a relatively large number of prepositions, and does not use postpositions.  The following list is traditionally cited:

This list includes two archaic prepositions ( and ), but leaves out two new Latinisms ( and ) as well as a large number of very important compound prepositions.

Prepositions in Spanish do not change a verb's meaning as they do in English. This is more due to the nature of English phrasal verbs rather than an inherent function of Spanish verbs or prepositions.

Conjunctions 
Thus,  ('father and son'),  ('Ferdinand and Isabella'),  ('subject or object'),  ('vertical or horizontal').

Syntax and syntactic variation

Order of constituents 
Spanish unmarked word order for affirmative declarative sentences is subject-verb-object (SVO); however, as in other Romance languages, in practice, word order is more variable, with topicalization and focus being the primary factors in the selection of a particular order. Verb-subject-object (VSO), verb-object-subject (VOS), and object-verb-subject (OVS) are also relatively common, while other orders are very uncommon outside of poetry.

Thus, to simply say, "My friend wrote the book", one would say (SVO):
 

Although bare VSO and VOS are somewhat rare in declarative independent clauses, they are quite common in sentences in which something other than the subject or direct object functions as the focus. For example:
  or  = "A few years ago, my friend wrote a book"
  or  = "Yesterday, my mother saw my friend and asked him about his book"

In many dependent clauses, the verb is placed before the subject (and thus often VSO or VOS) to avoid placing the verb in final position:
 , but rarely  = "This is the book that my friend wrote"

A sentence in which the direct object is the topic or "theme" (old information), while the subject is part of the comment, or "rheme" (new information), often assumes OVS order. In this case the direct object noun phrase is supplemented with the appropriate direct object pronoun; for example:
 

Because subject pronouns are often dropped, one will often see sentences with a verb and direct object but no explicitly stated subject.

In questions, VSO is usual (though not obligatory):
  = "Did my friend write the book?"

Yes/no questions, regardless of constituent order, are generally distinguished from declarative sentences by context and intonation.

Cleft sentences 
A cleft sentence is one formed with the copular verb (generally with a dummy pronoun like "it" as its subject), plus a word that "cleaves" the sentence, plus a subordinate clause. They are often used to put emphasis on a part of the sentence. Here are some examples of English sentences and their cleft versions:
 "I did it." → "It was I who did it" or colloquially "It was me that did it."
 "You will stop smoking through willpower." → "It is through willpower that you will stop smoking."

Spanish does not usually employ such a structure in simple sentences. The translations of sentences like these can be readily analyzed as being normal sentences containing relative pronouns. Spanish is capable of expressing such concepts without a special cleft structure thanks to its flexible word order.

For example, if we translate a cleft sentence such as "It was Juan who lost the keys", we get  Whereas the English sentence uses a special structure, the Spanish one does not. The verb  has no dummy subject, and the pronoun  is not a cleaver but a nominalising relative pronoun meaning "the [male] one that".  Provided we respect the pairings of "" and "", we can play with the word order of the Spanish sentence without affecting its structure – although each permutation would, to a native speaker, give a subtly different shading of emphasis.

As can be seen from the translations, if this word order is chosen, English stops using the cleft structure (there is no more dummy "it" and a nominalising relative is used instead of the cleaving word) whilst in Spanish no words have changed.

Here are some examples of such sentences:
  = "It was John who lost the keys"
  = "It is only three days that you have left"
  = "It will be I who tells him"
  = lit. "There are few who come and stay"

 * (incorrect)
  (correct)

When prepositions come into play, things become complicated.  Structures unambiguously identifiable as cleft sentences are used. The verb  introduces the stressed element and then there is a nominaliser. Both of these are preceded by the relevant preposition. For example:
  = "It was me to whom he gave permission", lit. "It was to me to whom he gave permission"
  = "It is us for whom this was made", lit. "It is for us for whom this was made"
  = "That is why I did it", more literally: "It is because of that that I did it", or completely literally: "It is because of that because of which I did it"
  = "It is this way that it must be done", lit. "It is this way how it must be done" ( replaces longer expressions such as )

This structure is quite wordy, and is therefore often avoided by not using a cleft sentence at all. Emphasis is conveyed just by word order and stressing with the voice (indicated here within bolding):
  = "He gave permission to me"
  = "This was done for us"
  = "I did it because of that"
  = "It must be done this way"

Foreign learners are advised to avoid this.
 
 
 
 

In the singular, the subordinate clause can agree either with the relative pronoun or with the subject of the main sentence, though the latter is seldom used. However, in the plural, only agreement with the subject of the main sentence is acceptable. Therefore:
Singular
  = "I was the one who drank it" (agreement with subject of main sentence)
  (preferred form with same meaning, agreement with )
  = "I am the one who knows" (agreement with subject of main sentence)
  = (preferred form with same meaning, agreement with )

Plural
  = "We are the only ones who do not have even a cent to bet" (agreement with subject of main sentence) (from dialogue of the Gabriel García Márquez novel )
  = "You girls are the ones who know" (agreement with subject of main sentence)

Clitic se 
Clitics are a necessary part of syntactic form and representation in Spanish. Defining a specific syntactic role of a clitic in Spanish is cumbersome, as they are used in a variety of ways. Syntactic approaches to this common element have attempted to find a universal way of handling them. For example, all languages are capable of having subjects, objects, and verbs, so a universal methodology to handling word order, whether SVO, VSO, or OSV, is imperative for a multilingual and universal syntactic representation system to work. As such, there has been great discussion and investigation in the literature for that particular word order element. Clitics, on the other hand, have been given relatively less thought and investigation, particularly an inquiry into an uncomplicated approach in their syntactic distribution. Clitics offer a myriad of functional roles depending upon the language in question, further complicating the situation.

Spanish is a diasporic language which also experiences diachronic variation. While Spanish is said to generally have flexible or "free" word order, others such as Pountain assert that the syntax is heavily influenced by topic and comment identification.

Historical approaches 
The syntactic role of the clitic  and its forms in Spanish has undergone much debate within the research with no obvious conclusion. Part of the difficulty stems from the variable role  and its other forms play with regard to the contextual grammar. Some syntacticians have aptly termed the clitic  as "paradigmatic" in reference to the complexity and variance of  features and functions. It is utilized in a variety of Spanish grammar contexts, including the following forms: reflexive pronoun, reciprocal pronoun, replacive pronoun (direct and indirect object), intrinsic pronoun (without the pronoun, the structure is ungrammatical), "derivational" pronoun, and "stylistic" pronoun. Further,  is used in addition with certain intransitive verbs, in reflexive-passive constructions, and in impersonal constructions.

As a class, clitics have such a variety of grammatical functions that they are not always pronominal, anaphoric or related to verbal arguments. Syntactically, they are most often found in non-argument benefactive theta-roles, in formation of passive, in formation of middle voice, and with a completive meaning. They can take the form of either phrasal constituents or words with an independent syntactic structure.

Despite  being grammatically diverse in Spanish grammatical application, it does certain specific roles. Zagona, author of a comprehensive Spanish syntax textbook, has extensively outlined form and function in depth, stating that:

 [sic] the only true subject clitic in Spanish is "impersonal"  "one".

The impersonal form is clearly defined as it does not double and uses only the third person singular verb form as in the impersonal form example here:

 
 Neg.          CL                   can-I.               walk    the       grass
 "You cannot walk on the grass."

Zagona also notes that, generally, oblique phrases do not allow for a double clitic, yet some verbs of motion are formed with double clitics:

 
 María                      CL                   go away-3.sg
 "Maria went away."

Imperatives in Spanish do not require the use of clitics, but when they are used, a specific word order must be followed. With an affirmative verb, the clitic succeeds the verb. However, in a negative command, word order alters in that the clitic precedes the verb.

 
 open-2.sg.CL(Acc.)
 "Open it."
 
 Neg                 CL(Acc.)                 open-2.sg.
 "Don't open it."

With continuous verbs, the clitic can precede the auxiliary verb, as in the example below:

  (correct)
 John    CL(Acc.)         was                  prepare-ing
 * (incorrect)
The clitic can also be placed after the participle, as in the following example:
  (correct)
 Maria        already      CL(Acc.)      have-3.sg.     prepare-pastpart
 * (incorrect)

The second phrase in each example above includes the clitic in this particular grammatical configuration as an attachment to the verb which is marked as ungrammatical.

Specific issues arise in clitic use and syntactic representation in terms of animacy. The Spanish language does not explicitly demonstrate in its grammar whether an object, either direct or indirect, refers to an animate or inanimate object. Therefore, the use of two clitics is common, although not always required. In this way, clitics can be doubled or "redundant" when two instances occur within the same phrase. Double clitics are found in instances of phrases with both direct accusative case objects and indirect dative objects in this way:

 
 CL(Dat.)         CL(Acc.)       tell-1.sg.pst     yesterday
 "I told you yesterday."

Regarding clitic doubling in Spanish, Ordóñez has suggested a "cluster" versus "split" formation, weighing consideration of the double clitic as a single unit (cluster) or a separable unit (split). The syntactic approach maintains a left-dislocation for the clitics while sustaining a separation from the verb. In the cluster model, both clitics are two adjacent constituents whereas the split model, one clitic has been split from the other, appearing higher on the syntactic tree. Both are still under the same c-command of the left branch but are no longer sisters to each other. Ordóñez suggests that when clitics are sisters, they may not even be considered constituents in the syntax. The hypothesis includes a requirement that a non-third person clitic is located higher on a tree than the third person clitic.

In fact, clitic climbing is a common feature in Romance languages with designation of clitics as unbound morphemes where the clitic "climbs" to adjoin the verb in a higher position. This widely discussed theory has involved raising of the clitic  as an unaccusative because of the lack of external argument in the grammar structure. The object clitic begins in the subject position of the verb, moving up to attach to the verb via adjunction on the left. Another theory is the "base-generation" which considers clitics to be affixes. However, both approaches fail when there is clitic doubling.

Recent approaches 
As recently as 2021, Cuervo has suggested that, for clitic doubling, the solution is considering the dative clitic to be the head of an Applicative Phrase with care taken in identifying whether the form is proclitic or enclitic. Cuervo addresses the difference by positing the following: if the process is proclitic, there is climbing; if the process is enclitic, there is no climbing. Thus, the determining factor for syntactic presentation is the type of verbal phrase.

Bradley illustrates some inflexible constructions, mainly when two third-person pronouns are within the same sentence and the indirect object must be expressed via :

 
 already            CL(Nom.)       CL(Acc.)         sent-presperf
 "I have already sent it"

In such cases, one solution is to use the particle  followed by an infinitive verb when the clitic precedes an auxiliary verb, as in the example provided below:

 
 CL(Nom.)       go-1.pres.        to         go to bed
 "We are going to bed"

The clitic is not attached to the infinitive verb; instead, it is in subject position. Grammatically, attachment to the verb occurs with a non-finite or a main conjugated verb. The clitic adjoins the verb and undergoes head movement to check its features.

Additional structures for direct and indirect objects have been suggested. Other views include the use of AgrS and AgrO for Spanish when clitics are involved. Daussá states that  can block features as it travels attached to the appropriate verb form from the feature geometry which alters the nodes.

Daussá’s realization of syntactic structure presents a solution for the paradigmatic issue of  using AgrO and AgrS. This model includes a Determiner Phrase that is nominative with verbal agreement in both person and number. Romain has also offered a thorough examination of the various theories, concluding that  is part of a Determiner Phrase. While there had been some postulation that clitics are heads of their own phrases, there has not been much support given to those claims.

Lewandowski has proposed an interconnected functionality for the Spanish reflexive pronoun, representing this concept via a cluster map indicating semantic, pragmatic, and grammatical functions. Another recent view is that there are two syntactic formations: first, that  is a probe for A-movement which results in a paradigmatic  and second, that non-paradigmatic  is represented by third person singular. This cross-referencing of syntax and morphology overlapping with a communicative stylistic approach has been suggested in the past.

Dialectal variations

Forms of address 
However, there are variations in informal address.  replaces  in much of Andalusia, the Canary Islands, and Latin America, except in the liturgical or poetic of styles. In some parts of Andalusia, the pronoun  is used with the standard  endings.

The choice of pronoun is a tricky issue and can even vary from village to village. Travellers are often advised to play it safe and call everyone .

A feature of the speech of the Dominican Republic and other areas where syllable-final /s/ is completely silent is that there is no audible difference between the second- and third-person singular form of the verb.

Voseo 

This gave three levels of formality:
 
  (originally )
  (today )

Whereas  was lost in standard Spanish, some dialects lost , and began using  as the informal pronoun. The exact connotations of this practice, called , depend on the dialect.

  – 
  – 

Similarly the verb  (to be) has:

  – 

  – 
  – 
  – 

So for the form for  this  is removed, and if the verb has more than one syllable, an accent is added to the last vowel:

  – 
  – 

  – 

In the present subjunctive, the same rules as for the present indicative apply, though these forms coexist in Argentina with those for the pronoun :

  – 
Or:
  – 

Outside Argentina, other combinations are possible.

 Vosotros imperative: -ar for -ad 
This is not accepted in the normative language.
  instead of 
  or  instead of 

 Non-normative -s on tú form 
A form used for centuries but never accepted normatively has an  ending in the second person singular of the preterite or simple past.

 Third-person object pronoun variation 
The third-person direct-object and indirect-object pronouns exhibit variation from region to region, from one individual to another, and even within the language of single individuals.

Here are some examples for this:

 :  (They saw him/her/it). Normative:  or  depending on the gender of the object.
 :  (They told her to shut up). Normative: . The person who is told something is an indirect object in Spanish, and the substituting pronoun is the same for both genders.
 :  (They told him to shut up). Normative: . See above.

 Queísmo and dequeísmo 
Noun clauses in Spanish are typically introduced by the complementizer , and such a noun clause may serve as the object of the preposition , resulting in the sequence  in the standard language. This sequence, in turn, is often reduced colloquially to just , and this reduction is called .

Some speakers, by way of hypercorrection (i.e. in an apparent effort to avoid the "error" of ), insert  before  in contexts where it is not prescribed in standard grammar. This insertion of "extraneous"  before  — called  — is generally associated with less-educated speakers.

Notes

 References 
 Alba de la Fuente, Anahi (2013). Clitic combinations in Spanish : syntax, processing and acquisition. Ottawa: Library and Archives Canada = Bibliothèque et Archives Canada. .
 
 
 Bradley, Peter T. (2004). Spanish : an essential grammar. I. E. Mackenzie. London: Routledge. . 
 
 Cuervo, Maria Cristina; Fábregas, Antonio; Acedo-Matellán, Victor; Armstrong, Grant; Pujol, Isabel (2021). The Routledge handbook of Spanish morphology. Abingdon, Oxon. 2021. .
 Daussà, E. J. The Syntactic Operator se in Spanish.
 
 
 
 
 Gonzalez Lopez, Veronica (2008). Spanish clitic climbing. 69-11A. Pennsylvania State University. .
 Lewandowski, Wojciech (2021-01-27). "Constructions are not predictable but are motivated: evidence from the Spanish completive reflexive". Linguistics. 59 (1): 35–74. . .
 Ordóñez, Francisco (2002-12-01). "Some Clitic Combinations in the Syntax of Romance". Catalan Journal of Linguistics. 1: 201. . .
 
 Romain IJ. A phase approach to spanish object clitics. [Order No. 3689735]. University of California, Los Angeles; 2015.
 
 Saab, Andrés (2020-12-29). "Deconstructing Voice. The syntax and semantics of u-syncretism in Spanish". Glossa: a journal of general linguistics. 5 (1). . .
 Serrano, María José; Aijón Oliva, Miguel Ángel (January 2011). "Syntactic variation and communicative style". Language Sciences. 33 (1): 138–153. .
 Zagona, Karen (2002). Syntax of Spanish. Port Chester: Cambridge University Press.'' .